Agrocybe farinacea is a species of mushroom in the family Strophariaceae. It has been reported to contain the hallucinogen psilocybin, however there has been no recent chemical analysis carried out on this mushroom, nor any modern reports of psychoactivity.

References

External links
Microscope Photos of Agrocybe farinacea (www.ne.jp)
Photos of Agrocybe farinacea (kinoko-ya.sakura.ne.jp)

Strophariaceae